Diane Scullion Littler is an American phycologist who has conducted research on marine algae for over 30 years, often in partnership with her husband Mark M. Littler. Her work has included taxonomic characterization of assemblages of tropical marine algae at sites across the globe, as well as her research on the physiological and ecological dynamics of algae. She has published over 120 scientific papers, as well as co-authored field guides for identifying coral reef algae.

Diane received her master's and doctorate degrees from Pacific Western University, and worked for much of her career as a research scientist at the Harbor Branch Oceanographic Institute, Florida Atlantic University, and as a research associate at the Smithsonian Institution. In 2003 she received a Lifetime Achievement Award from the American Academy of Underwater Sciences.

References

Year of birth missing (living people)
Living people
American phycologists
American marine biologists
Florida Atlantic University faculty
Women phycologists
Women marine biologists
American women biologists
Smithsonian Institution people
Place of birth missing (living people)
American women academics
21st-century American women